

Medalists

Standings

Men's Competition

Women's Competition

References
Complete 2001 Mediterranean Games Standings

Sports at the 2001 Mediterranean Games
Volleyball at the Mediterranean Games
2001 in volleyball